The traditional cucumber sandwich is a crustless tea sandwich (or finger sandwich) composed of thin slices of cucumber situated between two thin slices of lightly buttered white bread. The sandwich originated in the United Kingdom, and modern variants, largely of United States origin, introduce cream cheese, mayonnaise, chopped dill or spices, and salmon, and may substitute brown bread. One specific US variant includes benedictine, a green soft spread made from cucumbers and cream cheese.

Cucumber sandwiches are most often served for a light snack or for afternoon tea, a formal light meal served in the late afternoon, or in the early evening before the main supper. Cucumber sandwiches are also traditionally served in the tea break at club cricket matches in England.

Cultural and historical associations

Cucumber sandwiches formed an integral part of the stereotypical afternoon tea affair. By contrast, people of the era's lower working classes were thought to prefer a coarser but more satisfying protein-filled sandwich, in a "meat tea" that might substitute for supper.

Some writers have attempted to draw out an association between the daintiness of the sandwich and the perceived effeteness of the UK's aristocracy. Cucumber sandwiches are often used as a kind of shorthand in novels and films to identify upper-class people, occasionally in a derogatory manner. In the first act of Oscar Wilde's The Importance of Being Earnest (1895),  cucumber sandwiches that have expressly been ordered and prepared for Lady Bracknell's expected visit are all voraciously eaten beforehand by her nephew and host, Algernon Moncrieff; consequently he is forced to tell a little lie, with his butler's connivance: namely that "there were no cucumbers in the market this morning... not even for ready money".  In addition, the sandwiches were once considered appropriate delicacies to offer to visiting clergy, in times when such visits were still a common feature of English middle class life.

The popularity of the cucumber sandwich as an upper-class "dainty" reached its zenith in the Edwardian era, when cheap labour and plentiful coal enabled new techniques of producing cucumbers in hotbeds under glass through most of the year. With the declining popularity of tea as a meal in the United Kingdom,  there was a corresponding decline in the popularity of cucumber sandwiches, but they are still frequently served at teas, luncheons, and gatherings.  Most English cricket clubs supply malt vinegar and ground pepper to dash inside the sandwich, and this is the simplest form commonly used in England.

Cucumber sandwiches are often eaten in the summer months or in warmer climates, such as in parts of India. The English influence on Indian culture has made the sandwiches popular during cricket matches and weekend picnics. The Indian variant is flavoured with green chutney and sometimes contains slices of boiled potatoes. Indian Airlines served cucumber sandwiches as part of its usual vegetarian inflight meal in short-haul domestic flights, until its merger in 2011.

Preparation

A wide-bladed knife is used to obtain thin slices from a Pullman loaf. According to one measure, daylight should pass through the resulting fine pores of the bread. The slices of bread are buttered all the way to the edges in the thinnest coating, which is only to prevent the bread from becoming damp with cucumber juice, and the slices of peeled cucumber, which have been dashed with salt and lemon juice, are placed in the sandwich just before serving to prevent the sandwich from becoming damp. The crusts of the bread are cut away cleanly, creating tea sandwiches.

See also

 Canapé
 Cucumber cake
 Cucumber juice
 Cucumber sauce
 List of sandwiches
 Sandwiches de miga
 Tea (meal)
 Tea sandwich

References

Further reading
 

English cuisine
Indian cuisine
British sandwiches
British tea culture
Sandwich